Olešnice is a municipality and village in České Budějovice District in the South Bohemian Region of the Czech Republic. It has about 900 inhabitants.

Administrative parts
Villages of Buková and Lhotka are administrative parts of Olešnice.

History
The first written mention of Olešnice is from 1186.

References

Villages in České Budějovice District